Battle of Cassano or Battle of Cassano d'Adda refers to several battles fought near the city of Cassano d'Adda in Lombardy, Italy:

 Battle of Cassano (1259), fought by Ezzelino III da Romano and Oberto Pallavicino of Cremona against the Guelph League
 Battle of Cassano (1705), during the War of the Spanish Succession
 Battle of Cassano (1799), during the French Revolutionary Wars, between the Russians and the French